Dousa is a surname. Notable people with the surname include:

Andrew Dousa Hepburn (1830–1921), Presbyterian pastor, professor and President of Miami University and Davidson College
Benjamin Dousa (born 1992), Swedish politician 
Franciscus Dousa (1577–1630), Dutch classical scholar
Janus Dousa (1545–1604), Dutch statesman, jurist, historian, poet and philologist and the first Librarian of Leiden University Library
Patrick Dousa (born 1992), American floorball player

References